Mikhail Ilyich Surkov was a Soviet sniper in the 4th Rifle Division of the Red Army during World War II. He was born in a Siberian town of Bol'shay Salyr' next to  Krasnoyarsk and hailed from a family of hunters and fur-trappers.

According to some Soviet newspapers, Surkov had 702 confirmed kills during World War II, a total which would make him the most effective sniper of the European conflict. The top Soviet sniper is officially Ivan Sidorenko, who is credited with 500 confirmed kills, as postwar findings have shown that Surkov's figure very likely only served as propaganda.

References

1921 births
1953 deaths
Sniper warfare
Soviet military snipers
Soviet military personnel of World War II
Recipients of the Order of Lenin
Recipients of the Medal "For Courage" (Russia)